Olena Mykolayivna Nemashkalo (born 25 December 1963 in Leningrad) is a Soviet, Ukrainian and Croatian former handball player.

She competed for the Soviet Union in the 1988 Summer Olympics where she won the bronze medal with the Soviet team. She played all five matches and scored eight goals. At the 1990 World Championship she won the gold medal and was elected best left winger of the competition.

Later, she competed for Croatia in the 1996 European Championship where she finished second top scorer with 41 goals.

Her daughter, Ekatarina Nemaškalo, is also an handballer who competed for Croatia national team.

External links
profile

1963 births
Living people
Soviet female handball players
Ukrainian female handball players
Croatian female handball players
Olympic handball players of the Soviet Union
Handball players at the 1988 Summer Olympics
Olympic bronze medalists for the Soviet Union
Olympic medalists in handball
Medalists at the 1988 Summer Olympics
Croatian people of Ukrainian descent